Le Régiment de Maisonneuve is a Primary Reserve infantry regiment of the Canadian Forces.
The regiment is Canada's twenty-sixth most senior reserve infantry regiment, and comprises one battalion serving as part of the Canadian Army Reserves.

Lineage
This Reserve Force regiment originated in Montreal, Quebec on 4 June 1880, when the 85th Battalion of Infantry was authorized to be formed. Lieutenant-Colonel Julien Brosseau, VD, was the first Commanding Officer. It was redesignated as the 85th Regiment on 8 May 1900, as Le Régiment de Maisonneuve on 29 March 1920, as the 2nd (Reserve) Battalion, Le Régiment de Maisonneuve on 7 November 1940 and finally Le Régiment de Maisonneuve on 15 December 1945.

Lineage chart

History

The Great War 
During the Great War, details of the 85th Regiment were placed on active service on 6 August 1914 for local protection duties.
The 41st Battalion, CEF, was authorized on 7 November 1914 and embarked for Great Britain on 18 October 1915, where it provided reinforcements to the Canadian Corps in the field until 13 July 1916, when its personnel were absorbed by the 69th Battalion, CEF. The battalion was disbanded on 15 September 1920. The 206th Battalion, CEF, was authorized on 15 July 1916 and sent two reinforcing drafts to Bermuda. On 17 August 1916, its remaining personnel were absorbed, in Canada, by the 167th Battalion, CEF. The battalion was disbanded on 1 August 1918.

In 1920, as part of the Otter Committee's reforms, the 85th Infantry Regiment was restructured and renamed the Régiment de Maisonneuve, in memory of the founder of Montreal, Paul Chomedey de Maisonneuve.

Second World War 
The regiment mobilized Le Régiment de Maisonneuve, CASF, on 1 September 1939. It embarked for Great Britain on 24 August 1940. It was redesignated as the 1st Battalion, Le Régiment de Maisonneuve, CASF, on 7 November 1940. 17 On 7 July 1944, the battalion landed in France as part of the 5th Infantry Brigade, 2nd Canadian Infantry Division. It suffered heavy casualties in the Battle of the Scheldt, and was notably depleted by the time of the Battle of Walcheren Causeway. The unit recovered during the winter and was again in action during the Rhineland fighting and the final weeks of the war, taking part in the final campaigns in northern Netherlands, the Battle of Groningen, and the final attacks on German soil. The overseas battalion was disbanded on 15 December 1945.

The regiment subsequently mobilized the 3rd Battalion, Le Régiment de Maisonneuve, CASF, on 12 May 1942. It served in Canada in a home defence role as part of the 21st Infantry Brigade, 8th Canadian Division. The 3rd Battalion was disbanded on 15 October 1943.

Postwar 
In 1940 the regiment formed an alliance with The King's Shropshire Light Infantry.

In 1962 the city of Montreal accorded the regiment Freedom of the City as well as the right to bear the coat of arms of Montreal on its regimental colour.

The unit celebrated its centennial in 1980 and published a history. In 1983, the unit moved from District Number 1 to District Number 2 in Quebec. On 1 September 1991, the regiment transferred to the new district Number 1.

1997: The regiment was consolidated under the restructuring of 34 Canadian Brigade Group.

Alliances 
: The Rifles
 Royal Canadian Navy: HMCS Montréal

Battle honours 
In the list below, battle honours in capitals were awarded for participation in large operations and campaigns, while those in lowercase indicate honours granted for more specific battles. Battle honours in bold type are authorized to be emblazoned on regimental colours.The Great War

The Second World War

War in Afghanistan
AFGHANISTAN

Armoury

See also

 Military history of Canada
 History of the Canadian Army
 Canadian Forces
 List of armouries in Canada

Media
 Le Régiment de Maisonneuve vers la victoire 1944-1945 by Gérard Marchand (Apr 22 1997) 
 Bon coeur et Bon bras, Histoire du Régiment de Maisonneuve 1880-1980 by Jacques Gouin (1980)

Notes

References

External links
 Official Website - Le Régiment de Maisonneuve
 Regiments.org

Maisonneuve, Regiment de
Infantry regiments of Canada in World War II
Military units and formations established in 1880